Buckellacris is a genus of spur-throated grasshoppers in the family Acrididae. There are at least three described species in Buckellacris.

Species
These three species belong to the genus Buckellacris:
 Buckellacris chilcotinae (Hebard, 1922) i c g b
 Buckellacris hispida (Bruner, 1885) i c g
 Buckellacris nuda (E. M. Walker, 1889) i c g b (Buckell's timberline grasshopper)
Data sources: i = ITIS, c = Catalogue of Life, g = GBIF, b = Bugguide.net

References

Further reading

 
 

Melanoplinae
Articles created by Qbugbot